The 2023 Nordic Golf League is the 25th season of the Nordic Golf League (NGL), one of the third-tier tours recognized by the European Tour. The schedule is mainly a combination of events organised by the Danish Golf Tour (titled as the ECCO Tour for sponsorship reasons) and the Swedish Golf Tour (titled as the More Golf Mastercard Tour for sponsorship reasons).

Schedule
The following table lists official events during the 2023 season.

See also
2023 Danish Golf Tour
2023 Finnish Tour
2023 Swedish Golf Tour

Notes

References

Nordic Golf League
Nordic Golf League